Péter Takács (born 4 March 1956) is a Hungarian fencer. He competed in the team épée event at the 1980 Summer Olympics.

References

External links
 

1956 births
Living people
Hungarian male épée fencers
Olympic fencers of Hungary
Fencers at the 1980 Summer Olympics
Fencers from Budapest